Kevin Harvick is an American racing driver who won a Monster Energy NASCAR Cup Series championship. Over the course of his racing career, Harvick has won multiple races, 60 of which have been in the NASCAR Cup Series as well as 47 wins in the Xfinity Series and 14 wins in the Camping World Truck Series for a total of 121 wins across NASCAR's top 3 Series.

NASCAR

NASCAR Cup Series
In the Cup Series, Kevin Harvick, the 2001 Rookie of the Year and the 2014 series champion, has won 58 races to date, at 21 different tracks.

Xfinity Series
In the Xfinity Series, Harvick, the 2000 Rookie of the Year and two time series champion has won 47 races which ranks him third on the all-time wins. He's won at 21 different tracks.

Camping World Truck Series
In the Camping World Truck Series, Harvick has won 14 races at 9 different tracks.

K&N Pro Series West
In the K&N Pro Series West, Harvick, the 1998 champion, has won 7 races.

Autozone Southwest Series
In the Autozone Southwest Series, Harvick, has won 4 races.

See also
 List of all-time NASCAR Cup Series winners

References

Career achievements of racing drivers
NASCAR race wins
NASCAR-related lists